Kabutaran may refer to:
 Kabutaran, Khuzestan
 Kabutaran, Kohgiluyeh and Boyer-Ahmad
 Kabutaran, Lorestan